Nikulitsa was a Bulgarian noble from Larissa and governor of Servia during the reign of Samuil (r. 997–1014).

Biography
Nikulitsa received his name ("little Nicholas") because of his short height. In 1001, the Byzantines led by Basil II (r.  976–1025) besieged the city and after a long siege they managed to break through despite the garrison's desperate defence. To secure the fortress, the entire Bulgarian population was deported in the area called Boleron between the rivers Nestos and Hebros (Maritsa).

Nikulitsa was taken to Constantinople and given the title patrikios. Soon, however, he fled Constantinople and rejoined Samuil's forces, who were trying to take back Servia. Basil II reacted quickly, heading to the town with an army and repulsing the Bulgarians. Samuil and Nikulitsa retreated but soon after the latter was ambushed and captured again. He was taken back to the Byzantine capital where he was imprisoned.

He managed to escape once more and continued to fight. Nikulitsa was among the few nobles who continued the resistance in the mountainous areas of the country after the death of Emperor Ivan Vladislav in 1018. After his troops were surrounded by a Byzantine army, he understood that further resistance was pointless and surrendered to Basil II with the rest of his troops. Basil II sent him in Thessalonica under arrest.

Nikulitsa's grandson, Nikoulitzas Delphinas, led an unsuccessful Vlach rebellion in Thessaly in 1066.

References

Sources

Medieval Bulgarian nobility
10th-century births
11th-century deaths
10th-century Bulgarian people
11th-century Bulgarian people
Patricii
Bulgarian people of the Byzantine–Bulgarian Wars
Medieval Bulgarian military personnel
Military personnel from Larissa
Prisoners of war held by the Byzantine Empire